Wu-Tang: An American Saga is an American biographical drama streaming television series created by The RZA and Alex Tse, which premiered on September 4, 2019, on Hulu. The show portrays a fictionalized account of the formation of the Wu-Tang Clan. In January 2020, the series was renewed for a second season which premiered on September 8, 2021. In November 2021, the series was renewed for a third and final season which premiered on February 15, 2023.

Premise
Wu-Tang: An American Saga is set in New York City during the height of the crack cocaine epidemic in the early 1990s. It follows the Wu-Tang Clan's formation, a vision of Bobby Diggs aka The RZA (Sanders), and its rise amid the dangers and excesses that came with the epidemic. Seeking his own way out, Diggs turns to rap in order to carve a path to fame going against his older brother Divine (Martinez), who favored the drug trade as the means to giving their family a better life. The story depicts how it all came together for the clan as Diggs unites a dozen young black men who are torn between music and crime. The group battles against the forces that hold them down and these include their own occasional impulse to give up the fight.

Cast

Main
 Ashton Sanders as Bobby "RZA" Diggs
 Shameik Moore as Corey Woods / Sha Raider / Raekwon
 Siddiq Saunderson as Dennis Coles / D-Lover / Ghostface Killah
 Julian Elijah Martinez as Mitchell "Divine" Diggs
 Marcus Callender as Oliver "Power" Grant
 Erika Alexander as Linda Diggs
 Zolee Griggs as Shurrie Diggs
 David "Dave East" Brewster as Clifford "Shotgun" Smith / Method Man
 TJ Atoms as Russell Jones / Ason Unique / Ol' Dirty Bastard
 Johnell Xavier Young as Gary "GZA" Grice / The Genius

Recurring
 Joey Bada$$ (season 1) / Uyoata Udi (season 2) as Jason "Rebel" Hunter / Inspectah Deck
 Malcolm Xavier (season 1) as Haze, based on Ernest "Kase" Sayon.
 Moise Morancy as Treach 
 Caleb Castille as Darryl "Chino" Hill / Cappadonna
 Trayce Malachi as young Bobby Diggs
 Jaidon Walls as young Divine Diggs
 Vincent Pastore as Fat Larry
 Anthony Chisholm as Old Chess Player
 Jorge Lendeborg Jr. (season 1) as Jah Son
 Ebony Obsidian as Nia
 Stephen McKinley Henderson as Uncle Hollis
 Natalie Carter as Miss Gloria
 Robert Crayton (season 1) as Attila
 Bokeem Woodbine as Jerome
 Jamie Hector (season 1) as Andre D Andre
 Justus David-Graham as Randy Diggs
 Samuel McKoy-Johnson as Darius Coles 
 Amyrh Harris as Darren Coles
 Jake Hoffman as Steve Rifkind
 JaQwan J. Kelly as Jamel Irief / Masta Killa
 Martin Fisher as Head Janitor
 La La Anthony as Tracy Waples (season 2)
 Damani Sease as Lamont Jody Hawkins / Golden Arms / U-God (season 2)

Episodes

Season 1 (2019)

Season 2 (2021)

Season 3 (2023)

Production

Development
On October 11, 2018, it was announced that Hulu had given the production a series order consisting of ten episodes. The series was created by RZA and Alex Tse, both of whom were expected to write for the series and executive produce alongside Brian Grazer, Merrin Dungey, and Method Man. Consulting producers were set to consist of Ghostface Killah, Inspectah Deck, Masta Killa, and GZA as well as the estate of Ol' Dirty Bastard. Production companies were slated to include Imagine Television. On January 17, 2020, the series was renewed for a second season which premiered on September 8, 2021, with a three-episode release.
On November 4, 2021, Hulu renewed the series for a third and final season. On December 14, 2022, it was announced that the third and final season will premiere on February 15, 2023.

Filming
Principal photography for the series commenced in February 2019 in New York City, New York. Filming took place on locations in East Orange, Elmwood Park, Kearny, Newark, Paterson, Plainfield, and Secaucus in New Jersey.

Release
Wu Tang: An American Saga was released internationally on Disney + Star in selected territories.

Reception

Audience viewership 
According to Parrot Analytics, which looks at consumer engagement in consumer research, streaming, downloads, and on social media, Wu-Tang: An American Saga was the 10th most in-demand United States streaming series, during the week of September 11, 2021 to September 17, 2021.

Critical response
On Rotten Tomatoes, the first season holds an approval rating of 74% based on 19 reviews, with an average rating of 7.10/10. The site's critical consensus reads: "While not quite as impressive as its legendary subject matter, An American Saga is a beautifully rendered and raw exploration of the Wu-Tang journey." On Metacritic, it has a weighted average score of 58 out of 100 based on reviews from 4 critics, indicating "mixed or average reviews".

Accolades

References

External links
 
 

2010s American drama television series
2019 American television series debuts
2020s American drama television series
American biographical series
English-language television shows
Hip hop television
Hulu original programming
Wu-Tang Clan
Television shows set in New York City
Television series set in the 1990s
Television series based on singers and musicians
Television series by 20th Century Fox Television
Television series by Imagine Entertainment
Biographical films about singers
Works by RZA